Washington Township is one of the twenty-two townships of Coshocton County, Ohio, United States. As of the 2010 census the population was 760.

Geography
Located in the southeastern part of the county, it borders the following townships:
Bedford Township - north
Jackson Township - northeast
Virginia Township - east
Cass Township, Muskingum County - south
Jackson Township, Muskingum County - southwest corner
Pike Township - west

No municipalities are located in Washington Township, although the unincorporated community of Wakatomika lies at the center of the township.

Name and history
It is one of forty-three Washington Townships statewide.

Washington Township was organized in 1811, and its first mill was built one year later.

Government
The township is governed by a three-member board of trustees, who are elected in November of odd-numbered years to a four-year term beginning on the following January 1. Two are elected in the year after the presidential election and one is elected in the year before it. There is also an elected township fiscal officer, who serves a four-year term beginning on April 1 of the year after the election, which is held in November of the year before the presidential election. Vacancies in the fiscal officership or on the board of trustees are filled by the remaining trustees.

References

External links
County website

Townships in Coshocton County, Ohio
Townships in Ohio